Luis Antonio Rodríguez (born August 15, 1970 in Río Piedras, Puerto Rico) is a former Major League Baseball (MLB) shortstop and current manager for the Tigres de Quintana Roo of the Mexican League. He played for the Boston Red Sox during the  season.

Playing career
Listed at 5' 11", 165 lb., Rodríguez batted and threw right-handed. He was selected by Boston in the 1991 draft out of the University of Charleston.

In one-season career, Rodríguez was a .239 hitter (16-for-67) with nine RBI in 27 games, including one home run, one double, and seven runs scored.

Rodríguez also played in the Red Sox, Mariners and Cubs minor league systems from 1992 to 2001, hitting .243 with 11 home runs and 167 RBI in 616 games.

Managing career
On May 16, 2018, Rodríguez was contracted by the Puerto Rico Islanders of the Empire Professional Baseball League (EPBL). During the regular season, he led the team to a second-place finish with a 27–18 record. On August 12, 2018, Rodríguez managed the Islanders to the Zakari Cup (EPBL) championship by besting the New York Bucks in the final series. This was the team's first title in two seasons of existence.

See also
1996 Boston Red Sox season
List of Major League Baseball players from Puerto Rico

References

External links

BR minor leagues
Retrosheet

1970 births
Living people
Boston Red Sox players
Major League Baseball shortstops
Major League Baseball players from Puerto Rico
Elmira Pioneers players
Lynchburg Red Sox players
New Britain Red Sox players
Sarasota Red Sox players
Pawtucket Red Sox players
People from Cidra, Puerto Rico
Orlando Rays players
Nashua Pride players
West Tennessee Diamond Jaxx players
Bridgeport Bluefish players